Federico Baldissera Bartolomeo Cornaro (16 November 1579 – 5 June 1653) was an Italian Catholic Cardinal and Patriarch of Venice.

Early life

Cornaro was born in Venice on 16 November 1579, the son of Doge Giovanni Cornaro and Chiara Delfino; he belonged to S. Paolo line of the House of Cornaro. He was the brother of Doge Francesco Cornaro. He started his education under the tutelage of his Cardinal uncle, until 1598 when his uncle died. Thereafter he returned to Venice and studied at the University of Padua. In 1602, he went to Rome and became a cleric of the Apostolic Chamber under Pope Clement VIII. In 1607, he was appointed Governor of Civitavecchia.

Ecclesiastic career

In February 1623, he was elected Bishop of Bergamo, but retained the clericate of the Apostolic Chamber, and was consecrated in April by Cardinal Marcantonio Gozzadini. Three years later he was elevated to Cardinal by Pope Urban VIII and was installed as Cardinal-Priest of Santa Maria in Traspontina and appointed Bishop of Venice. His elevation was not without controversy as the Republic of Venice prohibited any son of a Doge from accepting a papal appointment. Eventually, the Venetian senate approved the promotion but refused to approve his proposed appointments as Bishop of Vicenza or Bishop of Padua.

Cornaro was appointed Cardinal-Priest of Santa Cecilia in Trastevere in 1627 and San Marco in 1629 before being promoted to Patriarch of Venice in June 1631, a position he held until 1644. In the intervening period, he was appointed Camerlengo of the Sacred College of Cardinals from 1639 to 1641.

Later life and death

In 1644, he resigned his patriarchate and participated in the Papal conclave of 1644 which elected Pope Innocent X. In 1646 he became Cardinal-Priest of Santa Maria in Trastevere. In 1652, he opted for the order of bishops to become Cardinal-Bishop of Albano. Cornaro died on 5 June 1653 in Rome and was buried at the Cornaro Chapel in the church of Santa Maria della Vittoria.

References

1579 births
1653 deaths
17th-century Italian cardinals
Cardinals created by Pope Urban VIII
Patriarchs of Venice
Bishops of Bergamo
Federico Baldissera Bartolomeo
17th-century Roman Catholic bishops in the Republic of Venice